Mill Theatre Dundrum, also known as the dlr Mill Theatre, is a theatre in the Dundrum Town Centre shopping centre in Dublin, Ireland. It was opened by Mary McAleese on 4 May 2006.

There are 205 seats in the theatre's main auditorium. The seating can be retracted (via a mechanical system) to provide practice or performance space. The stage is a proscenium arch which is at ground level.

In 2012, the building's studio space was renamed the "Maureen O'Hara Studio", in honour of actress Maureen O'Hara who was born in nearby Ranelagh. The studio is "dedicated to nurturing young talent in the theatre and film industry".

There is also a gallery space used for exhibiting visual arts.

References

External links
Official website

Theatres in Dublin (city)
Dundrum, Dublin